Akasya Durağı was a Turkish comedy television series on Kanal D, which initially broadcast in 2008.

Overview 
The story is about Nuri (mostly called Dad, because of his age), an old, wise and kind man and his taxi company called Akasya Durağı. As he is a retired man, the story circles mostly around the taxi drivers, the tea maker-office boy, their family and their friends, with situations where they end up in jail, in between mafia shootouts and in other comedic but also adventurous circumstances. Due to the series not having a common thread running throughout it, the story goes on as said.

Turkish comedy television series
2008 Turkish television series debuts
2012 Turkish television series endings
2000s Turkish television series
2010s Turkish television series
Kanal D original programming
Turkish television series endings
Television shows set in Istanbul
Television series produced in Istanbul